The 1967–68 season was the 29th season in UE Lleida's existence, and their 2nd year in Segunda División after 1966 promotion.

Squad

Competitions

Pre-season

League

Results by round

Copa del Generalísimo

Friendly

Copa Presidente 1968

External links
1967-68 season

1968
Lleida